Psilogramma maxmouldsi is a moth of the  family Sphingidae. It is known from Queensland.

References

Psilogramma
Moths described in 2001
Endemic fauna of Australia